This is a list of shopping malls in Peru.

Ancash 
 Chimbote
 Megaplaza Chimbote
 Huaraz
 Megaplaza Huaraz (3T 2014)

Arequipa 
 Mall Aventura Plaza Arequipa
 Open Plaza Arequipa
 Parque Lambramani
 Real Plaza Arequipa
Arequipa Center
Arequipa Plaza Norte 
 La Marina Shopping Center (2014)

Ayacucho 
 Huamanga
 Megaplaza Ayacucho (2014)

Cajamarca 
 El Quinde Shopping Plaza Cajamarca
 Open Plaza Cajamarca (2T 2014)
 Real Plaza Cajamarca

Callao 
 Minka
 Mall Aventura Plaza Bellavista
 Open Plaza Canta-Callao

Cusco 
 Mall Aventura Plaza Cusco (2015)
 Mall Power Center San Jerónimo 
 Real Plaza Cusco

Huanuco 
 Open Plaza Huánuco 2T 2014
 Real Plaza Huanuco

Ica 
 Ica
 El Quinde Shopping Plaza Ica
 Plaza del Sol Ica
 Chincha
 Mega Plaza Express Chincha

Junín 
 Huancayo
 Open Plaza Huancayo (2015)
 Real Plaza Huancayo

La Libertad 
 Trujillo
 Mall Aventura Plaza Trujillo
 Open Plaza Los Jardines
 Penta Mall Mansiche (strip center)
 Real Plaza Trujillo

Lambayeque 
 Chiclayo
 Open Plaza Chiclayo
 Real Plaza Chiclayo

Lima

Lima province 
 Arenales Mall
 Bajada Balta Shopping Center
 Balta Shopping (strip center)
 CC La Rambla Breña
 Caminos del Inca
 CC La Rambla San Borja
 Cento Comercial Jesus María
 Cento Comercial Risso
 El Polo
 Jockey Plaza Shopping Center
 Larcomar
 Lima Outlet Center
 Mall Aventura Plaza Santa Anita
 Mall del Sur - San Juan de Miraflores
 Mega Express Villa
 Mega Express Villa el Salavador
 Mega Plaza Norte
 Molina Plaza
 Monterrico Plaza (2015)
 Open Plaza Angamos
 Open Plaza Atocongo
 Open Plaza La Marina
 Parque Agustino
 Parque El Golf (2015)
 Paso Salaverry (strip) (2014)
 Penta Mall Conquistadores
 Penta Mall Viñedos
 Plaza Norte
 Plaza Lima Sur
 Plaza San Miguel
 Real Plaza Centro Cívico
 Real Plaza Chorrillos
 Real Plaza Este (2013)
 Real Plaza Primavera
 Real Plaza Pro
 Real Plaza Puruchuco
 Real Plaza Salaverry (2013)
 Real Plaza Santa Clara
 Royal Plaza

Barranca 

 MegaPlaza Barranca

Cañete 
 Boulevard de Asia
 MegaPlaza Cañete

Huacho 
 Plaza del Sol
 MegaPlaza Huaura

Loreto 
 Iquitos
 Mall Aventura Plaza Iquitos (2015)

Piura 
 Piura
Open Plaza Piura
 Plaza de la Luna
 Plaza del Sol Piura
Real Plaza Piura
 Sullana
Real Plaza Sullana
 Talara
Real Plaza Talara

Puno 
 Juliaca
 Real Plaza Juliaca
 Puno
 Power Center Plaza Vea

San Martín 
  Moyobamba
 Cinerama Plaza (strip center)

Tacna 
Mall Aventura Plaza Tacna (2014)
Power Center Plaza Vea

Tumbes 
Real Plaza Tumbes (2015)

Ucayali 
 Pucallpa
Open Plaza Pucallpa 
Real Plaza Pucallpa (2014)

References 

Shopping malls in Peru